Así te deseo is a 1948 Argentine drama film directed and written by Belisario García Villar.

Cast
 Roberto Airaldi
 Anaclara Bell
 Daniel de Alvarado
 Carmen Idal
 Carlos Morganti
 Angelina Pagano
 Amalia Sánchez Ariño
 Ernesto Vilches

External links
 

1948 films
1940s Spanish-language films
Argentine black-and-white films
1948 drama films
Films directed by Belisario García Villar
Argentine drama films
1940s Argentine films